Thomas Neill Cream (27 May 1850 – 15 November 1892), also known as the Lambeth Poisoner, was a Scottish-Canadian medical doctor and serial killer who poisoned his victims with strychnine. Over the course of his career, he murdered up to ten people in three countries, targeting mostly lower-class women, prostitutes and pregnant women seeking abortions. He was convicted and sentenced to death, and was hanged on 15 November 1892.

Unsubstantiated rumours claimed his last words as he was being hanged were a confession that he was Jack the Ripper – even though official records state he was in prison in Illinois at the time of the Ripper murders.

Early life 
Born in Glasgow, Cream was raised outside Quebec City after his family moved there in 1854. He attended the now-defunct Lachute Academy before becoming a student at McGill University in Montreal, graduating with an MDCM degree in 1876 (his thesis was on chloroform). His post-graduate training was at St Thomas's Hospital Medical School in London, and in 1878 he obtained additional qualifications as a physician and surgeon in Edinburgh. He then returned to North America seeking to practise in a community in need of physicians; after a brief experience in Des Moines, Iowa, he relocated to London, Ontario.

In 1876, while living in Waterloo, Quebec, Cream met Flora Brooks, and they began courting. Brooks became pregnant a few months later after Cream had promised to marry her. He attempted to perform an abortion but failed, leaving her severely ill. He tried to escape to Montreal, but was caught by Flora's father, who forced him to return and to marry her. The day after the wedding, he left for England to continue his medical education. The Brooks family never saw or heard from him again. Flora Brooks almost fully recovered, but died of consumption in 1877.

Murders

London, Ontario 
Cream returned to North America in 1878, and established a medical practice in London. He was charged under Ontario's Medical Act with practicing without a license, and later pled guilty. However, this did not deter patients from his office. In 1879, Catharine Hutchinson Gardner was found dead in a privy behind Cream's office at 204 Dundas Street. She was pregnant, and had been murdered with a handkerchief soaked in chloroform. Cream had refused to help her with an abortion, instead urging her to accuse a local businessman of being the father. Cream claimed she had threatened to poison herself when he had not agreed to perform the abortion, and that she had written him a letter in which she named the businessman as the father. However, Gardner's family and roommate denied that she had written it, as the signature and handwriting on the letter did not match her own, and it was dismissed as forgery. Despite rumours and overwhelming evidence against Cream, authorities took no further action, and the case was never solved.

Chicago 
Cream established a medical practice not far from the red-light district in Chicago, offering illegal abortions to prostitutes. He was investigated in August 1880, after the death of Mary Anne Faulkner, a woman on whom he had allegedly operated, but escaped prosecution due to lack of evidence. In December 1880, another patient, Miss Stack, died after treatment by Cream, and he subsequently attempted to blackmail the pharmacist who had filled the prescription.

In April 1881, a woman named Alice Montgomery died of strychnine poisoning following an abortion, in a rooming house barely a block from Cream's office. The case was ruled a murder but never solved. The location, time period, and method make Cream a likely suspect.

On 14 July 1881, Daniel Stott died of strychnine poisoning at his home in Boone County, Illinois, after Cream supplied him with an alleged remedy for epilepsy. The death was attributed to natural causes, but Cream wrote to the coroner blaming the pharmacist for the death after he again attempted blackmail. This time, Cream was arrested, along with Mrs Julia A. (Abbey) Stott, who had allegedly become Cream's mistress and procured poison from Cream to do away with her husband. She turned state's evidence to avoid jail, laying the blame on Cream, which left him to face a murder conviction on his own. He was sentenced to life imprisonment in Joliet Prison. Daniel Stott's friends erected a tombstone at his grave, which reads: "Daniel Stott Died June 12, 1881 Aged 61 Years, poisoned by his wife and Dr Cream."

Cream was released in July 1891. Governor Joseph W. Fifer had commuted his sentence after Cream's brother pleaded for leniency and allegedly bribed the authorities.

London 
Using money inherited from his father, who had died in 1887, Cream sailed for England, arriving in Liverpool on 1 October 1891 (three years after the Jack the Ripper killings had been committed). He went to London and took lodgings at 103 Lambeth Palace Road. At the time, Lambeth was riddled with poverty, petty crime, and prostitution.

On 13 October 1891, Ellen "Nellie" Donworth, a 19-year-old prostitute, received two letters from Cream, and agreed to meet him. He offered her a drink from a bottle. She became severely ill that night and died from what was later found to be strychnine poisoning. During her inquest, Cream wrote to the coroner under the pseudonym A. O'Brien, Detective, offering to name the murderer in return for a £300,000 reward. He also wrote to W. F. D. Smith, owner of the W H Smith bookstalls, accusing him of the murder and demanding money for his silence.

On 20 October, Cream met with a 27-year-old prostitute named Matilda Clover, and offered her pills, instructing her to take four before bed. She began experiencing violent, painful spasms later that night, and died two hours later. Her death was assumed to be heart failure due to alcohol withdrawal. Cream, under the name M. Malone, wrote a letter to the prominent physician Dr. William Broadbent, claiming to have evidence of his involvement in Clover's death and demanding £25,000 for his silence. Broadbent contacted Scotland Yard, and they set a trap for the blackmailer when he would come to collect the money. However, no one was caught.

On 2 April 1892, after a vacation in Canada, Cream returned to London, where he met Louise Harvey (née Harris), a prostitute. He offered her two pills, insisting she swallow them right away. Harvey, suspicious of him, pretended to swallow the pills he had given her but secretly threw them from a bridge into the River Thames.

On 11 April, Cream met two prostitutes, Alice Marsh, 21, and Emma Shrivell, 18, and spent the night with them in their flat, then before leaving offered them three pills each and a can of tinned salmon. Both women died later that night from strychnine poisoning.

Capture 
Through his blackmail letters, Cream succeeded in drawing close attention to himself. Not only did the police quickly determine the innocence of those accused, but they noticed something telling in the accusations made by the anonymous letter-writer: he had referred to the murder of Matilda Clover. Clover's death had been registered under natural causes, related to her drinking. The police quickly realised that the false accuser who had written the letter was the serial killer now referred to in the newspapers as the "Lambeth Poisoner".

Not long afterward, Cream met a policeman from New York City who was visiting London. The policeman had heard of the Lambeth Poisoner, and Cream gave him a brief tour of where the various victims had lived. The American happened to mention it to a British policeman who found Cream's detailed knowledge of the case suspicious.

The police at Scotland Yard put Cream under surveillance and soon discovered his habit of visiting prostitutes. They also conducted an investigation in the United States and Canada and learned about their suspect's history, including the conviction for a murder by poison in 1881.

On 3 June 1892, Cream was arrested for the murder of Matilda Clover, and on 13 July he was formally charged with the murders of Clover, Donworth, Marsh, and Shrivell, the attempted murder of Harvey, and extortion. From the start, he insisted he was only "Dr Thomas Neill", not Thomas Neill Cream, and the newspapers usually referred to him as "Dr Neill" in their coverage of the proceedings.

At the inquest into Matilda Clover's death that was held by Athelstan Braxton Hicks in July 1892, he read out a letter signed by Jack the Ripper, declaring "Dr Neill" innocent, which produced laughter, including from "Neill". The jury returned the verdict that Matilda Clover died from strychnine poisoning administered by "Thomas Neill".

Trial and execution 
His trial lasted from 17 to 21 October 1892. After a deliberation lasting only 12 minutes, the jury found him guilty of all counts, and Justice Henry Hawkins sentenced him to death.

Less than a month after his conviction, on 15 November, Cream was hanged at Newgate Prison by James Billington. As was customary with all executed criminals, his body was buried the same day beneath the flagstones of the prison along with other executed criminals, marked by one initial. His body was disinterred in 1902 and moved to London's municipal cemetery. He is now buried in an unmarked grave in section 339.

"I am Jack the..." 

Billington claimed that Cream's last words on the scaffold were "I am Jack The..." Billington promoted this alleged incident as proof that he was responsible for executing the notorious Victorian serial killer Jack the Ripper.

These claims are unsubstantiated, as police officials and others who attended the execution made no mention of any such event. Moreover, Cream was in prison at the time of the Ripper murders in 1888, so it would have been impossible for him to be Jack the Ripper.

Ripperologist Donald Bell speculated that Cream had bribed officials and been let out of prison before his official release, and Sir Edward Marshall-Hall speculated that Cream's prison term had been served by a look-alike in his place. Such notions are extremely unlikely and contradict all known evidence given by the Illinois authorities, newspapers of the time, Cream's solicitors, Cream's family, and Cream himself.

One of Cream's biographers suggested that Cream, on the scaffold and about to be hanged, was so frightened that he lost control of his bodily functions and stammered "I am ejaculating", which could have been mistaken for "I am Jack".

English-Canadian writer Chris Scott won an Arthur Ellis Award for Best Crime Novel in 1989 for Jack, a novel based on the premise that Cream was Jack the Ripper.

Analysis 
The motivation for the series of poisonings has never been settled. It has generally been assumed that Cream was a sadist who enjoyed the thought of his victims' agonized deaths, and his control over them (even if he was not physically present to witness these). However, Cream was also interested in money, as evidenced by his attempts at extortion in almost all of his crimes, so it remains a possibility that he committed the murders as part of ill-planned attempts to profit from them. From the start of the series of crimes Cream wrote blackmail notes to prominent people; and the poisoning of his one known male victim, Daniel Stott, was committed with the hope that Stott's wealthy widow would share the deceased's estate with him.

In addition to the five poisonings Cream was convicted of, he is suspected in the murder of his wife Flora Brooks in 1877, and at least four other women who died in his care while undergoing abortions.

In popular culture 

In the first episode (in 2000) of Murder Rooms: Mysteries of the Real Sherlock Holmes, the young Arthur Conan Doyle and Joseph Bell pursue a murder case that involves a Thomas Neill, played by  Alec Newman. At the end, a postscript further identifies him as Thomas Neill Cream, who attended medical school alongside Conan Doyle.

In the 2015 BBC One television series River, Cream appears frequently to and converses with D.I. John River as a "manifest".

See also 
 List of serial killers in the United Kingdom

References

Notes

Bibliography 
 
 
 Fennario, David. Doctor Thomas Neill Cream—Mystery at McGill. Vancouver: Talonbooks, 1993
Jobb, Dean, The Case of the Murderous Dr. Cream: The Hunt for a Victorian Era Serial Killer, Harper Avenue (HarperCollins Canada), June 1, 2021.

Further reading 
 Bloomfield, Jeffrey: "Gallows Humor: The Alleged Ripper Confession of Dr. Cream." Dan Norder (ed.) Ripper Notes, July 2005, Issue #23
 Bloomfield, Jeffrey: "The Dr Wrote Some Letters." R.W.Stone, Q.P.M. (ed.), The Criminologist, Winter 1991, Volume 15, Number 4
 Jenkins, Elizabeth: "Neill Cream, Poisoner." Reader's Digest Association, Great Cases of Scotland Yard, 1978
 Jesse, F. Tennyson, Murder and Its Motives, Chapter V: "Murder for the Lust of Killing: Neill Cream", p. 184-215, Garden City, N.Y.: Doubleday & Co., Inc. – Dolphin Books, 1924, 1958.
 Jobb, Dean,The Case of the Murderous Dr. Cream: The Hunt for a Victorian Era Serial Killer, HarperCollins. London. 2021
 Lustgarten, Edgar, The Murder and the Trial, "3. Neill Cream", pp. 59–62, New York: Charles Scribner's Sons, 1958.
 Rumbelow, Donald, The Complete Jack the Ripper (True Crime), Penguin Books Ltd: 1988. 
 Shore, W. Teignmouth, ed.: Trial of Thomas Neill Cream, (Notable British Trials series), London and Edinburgh: W. Hodge, [1923].

1850 births
1881 murders in the United States
1891 murders in the United Kingdom
1892 murders in the United Kingdom
1892 deaths
1890s murders in London
19th-century British criminals
19th-century Canadian criminals
19th-century executions by England and Wales
19th-century Scottish medical doctors
Abortion providers
Canadian expatriates in the United States
Canadian male criminals
Canadian people imprisoned abroad
Crimes against sex workers
Criminals from Glasgow
Executed British serial killers
Executed Canadian serial killers
Executed Scottish people
Jack the Ripper
Male serial killers
McGill University Faculty of Medicine alumni
Medical doctors from Glasgow
Medical practitioners convicted of murdering their patients
Medical serial killers
Murder in London
People convicted of murder by England and Wales
People convicted of murder by Illinois
People from Quebec City
Poisoners
Recipients of American gubernatorial clemency
Scottish emigrants to Canada
Scottish male criminals
Scottish people convicted of murder
Scottish people imprisoned abroad
Scottish serial killers
Strychnine poisoning